Aechmea serrata is a plant species in the genus Aechmea. It was reportedly originally from Martinique in the West Indies, but now extinct in the wild. It does survive as a cultivated ornamental.

Cultivars
Cultivars include:

 Aechmea 'Eileen'
 Aechmea 'Henrietta'
 × Anamea 'Raspberry Ice'

References

serrata
Flora of Martinique
Garden plants
Plants described in 1753
Taxa named by Carl Linnaeus